Lambrechten is a municipality in the district of Ried im Innkreis in the Austrian state of Upper Austria.

Geography
Lambrechten lies in the Innviertel. About 12 percent of the municipality is forest, and 78 percent is farmland.

References

Cities and towns in Ried im Innkreis District